Elga Olga Svendsen (14 April 1906 – 26 July 1992) was a Danish film actress and singer. As Elga Olga she released one album and a dozen singles. She appeared in 15 films between 1934 and 1984. She was born in Copenhagen, Denmark and died in Denmark.

Filmography
 7-9-13 (1934)
 Thummelumsen (1941)
 Lykke på rejsen (1947)
 Vores fjerde far (1951)
 Frihed forpligter (1951)
 Kærlighedsdoktoren (1952)
 Krudt og klunker (1958)
 Pigen i søgelyset (1959)
 Mig og min lillebror (1967)
 Rend mig i revolutionen (1970)
 Snart dages det brødre (1974)
 Brand-Børge rykker ud (1976)
 Affæren i Mølleby (1976)
 Zappa (1983)
 Tro, håb og kærlighed (1984)

Discography
 Elga Olga Med Willy Grevelunds Orkester: Elga Olga Af København (Sonet Records, 1976)

External links

1906 births
1992 deaths
Danish film actresses
Actresses from Copenhagen
20th-century Danish actresses
Sonet Records artists